Big Spring Baptist Church, also known as First Baptist Church, is a historic Baptist church building located near Elliston, Montgomery County, Virginia.  It was built about 1880, and is a one-story, four-bay, nave plan frame structure with a high gable roof. It features a projecting three-stage central tower.  Also on the property is the contributing church cemetery where the deceased members of most of the area's African-American families are buried.

It was listed on the National Register of Historic Places in 1989.

References

African-American history of Virginia
Baptist churches in Virginia
Churches on the National Register of Historic Places in Virginia
Churches completed in 1880
Churches in Montgomery County, Virginia
National Register of Historic Places in Montgomery County, Virginia
Elliston, Virginia